Miconia seticaulis is a species of plant in the family Melastomataceae. It is endemic to Ecuador.  Its natural habitat is subtropical or tropical moist lowland forests.

References

Endemic flora of Ecuador
seticaulis
Vulnerable plants
Taxonomy articles created by Polbot